Pierre Cogan (10 January 1914 – 5 January 2013) was a French professional cyclist who competed between the 1930s and the 1950s.

Biography
A professional from 1935 to 1951, Cogan notably won the Grand Prix de Plouay in 1936 and the Grand Prix des Nations (the unofficial World Time Trail Championship) in 1937. He has the distinction of being among the best of the Tour de France riders both before and after the Second World War. He was the 11th in the 1935 Tour de France and still 7th in 1950. He rode his last Tour de France in 1951 where he finished 19th. Towards the end of his life, Cogan was the oldest Tour de France rider still alive.
 
His brother Joseph was also a professional road bicycle racer between 1936 and 1942.

Pierre also appeared in the feature-length documentary, "Chasing Legends" about the Tour de France.

References

External links
Pierre Cogan at siteducyclisme.net

1914 births
2013 deaths
French male cyclists
People from Auray
Sportspeople from Morbihan
Cyclists from Brittany